Oil City is an unincorporated community in the Town of Sheldon in Monroe County, Wisconsin, United States. It was the site of a nineteenth-century oil swindle. It is located about halfway between Wilton and Ontario on WI-131.

A cemetery in the area, known either as the Sheldon Township Cemetery or the Oil City Cemetery, was used from the 1860s to the early 1900s.  It was plowed over by a local farmer in the 1940s; while the cemetery has since been restored, many of the original headstones are now gone.

Notes

Further reading 
 

Unincorporated communities in Monroe County, Wisconsin
Unincorporated communities in Wisconsin